Sigalevitch may refer to :

 Lev Sigalevitch (1921-2004), Russian painter
 Valery Sigalevitch (1950-), Russian pianist (son of Lev Sigalevitch)
 Anna Sigalevitch (1986-), French actress and pianist